The Mighty is a 1998 American coming of age buddy comedy-drama film directed by Peter Chelsom and written by Charles Leavitt. Based on the book Freak the Mighty by Rodman Philbrick, the film stars Sharon Stone, Gena Rowlands, Gillian Anderson, Harry Dean Stanton, Kieran Culkin, James Gandolfini and Elden Henson.

Plot
Kevin "Freak" Dillon (Kieran Culkin) is a 12-year-old boy suffering from Morquio syndrome and living with his mother Gwen "Fair Gwen" Dillon (Sharon Stone). He is extremely intelligent and is obsessed with flights of fancy, but due to his disability, he walks with leg braces and crutches. Meanwhile, Maxwell "Max" Kane (Elden Henson) is a 14-year-old beastly yet good-natured boy with learning challenges and living with his maternal grandparents Susan "Gram" (Gena Rowlands) and Elton "Grim" Pinneman (Harry Dean Stanton). He has flunked the seventh grade twice and is tormented by Tony "Blade" Fowler (Joseph Perrino), a teenage delinquent who is the leader of a teenage bully gang named the "Doghouse Boys". When Kevin is assigned as Max's reading tutor, they form a bond of friendship over the similar circumstances they share, such as both being outcasts in their school and their fathers abandoning them.

Freak and Max go to a local festival to watch a firework show where they get attacked by Blade and his gang. The two then escape into a nearby lake with Freak riding on Max's shoulders. Freak later witnesses the "Doghouse Boys" putting someone's purse in a sewer. The two retrieve the purse but are once again confronted by Blade and his gang. They attempt to attack Freak, but Max stops them by picking up a manhole cover and throwing it at the gang, forcing them to flee in a panic. Max and Freak find that the purse belongs to a woman named Loretta Lee (Gillian Anderson). They return the purse to Loretta who is married to Iggy Lee (Meat Loaf), a former gang leader. The couple are old friends of Max's father Kenny "Killer" Kane (James Gandolfini) who is currently in prison for the strangulation murder of Max's mother when Max was four years old, which Max witnessed.

On Christmas Eve, Max is kidnapped by Killer Kane who has been released on parole and is taken to Iggy and Loretta's apartment, where he is tied up. Loretta attempts to help Max escape but Killer attempts to strangle her. Max's seeing the attack prompts a repressed memory of Killer Kane killing his mother; he breaks free of his bonds and attacks his own father.

Freak tracks Max and Killer Kane to Iggy and Loretta's apartment and breaks in, armed with a squirt gun he claims is loaded with sulfuric acid which he got for Christmas, which he sprays in Killer Kane's eyes. Just before an angered Killer Kane regains himself and attempts to hurt Freak, Max tackles him through the wall where the police are waiting; Killer Kane is then returned to prison for life without the possibility of parole while Freak and Max run home to have Christmas dinner together along with Gwen, Grim and Gram. While exchanging Christmas gifts, Freak gives Max a blank book and tells him to write in it. That night, Freak dies in his sleep due to heart problems in which the next morning Max hears the news from Gram and gives chase to the ambulance on foot. Max recalls the biogenic intervention unit of a research center Freak had mentioned earlier and rushes there, only to discover that the lab in question is nothing other than a commercial laundromat. Heartbroken, Max breaks down in grief among the laundry workers.

The following weeks, Max continues attending school but spends his spare time locked in the basement, even missing Freak's funeral and seeing Gwen moving away. He later runs into Loretta at a bus stop, who advises him that "doing nothing's a drag, kid". He takes this advice to heart and even works up the courage to answer a question from his teacher during a lecture. Inspired by their bond, Max remembers Freak and all the adventures they had so he decides to write it all in the empty book Freak had given him for Christmas. Max gets writer's block on the last page and puts an illustration of King Arthur's grave which reads "Here Lies King Arthur, Once and Future King", to symbolize his belief that he will see Freak again. Max then takes Freak's ornithopter and winds it up, making it fly. As the ornithopter flies off, a narration by Max is heard:

Cast
 Elden Henson as Maxwell "Max" Kane/The Mighty
 Kieran Culkin as Kevin Dillon/Freak
 Sharon Stone as Gwen "The Fair Gwen Of Air" Dillon
 Gena Rowlands as Susan "Gram" Pinneman
 Harry Dean Stanton as Elton "Grim" Pinneman
 James Gandolfini as Kenneth "Kenny" David Kane aka "Killer" Kane
 Gillian Anderson as Loretta Lee
 Meat Loaf as Iggy Lee
 Jenifer Lewis as Mrs. Addison
 Joseph Perrino as Tony "Blade" Fowler 
 Dov Tiefenbach as Doghouse Boy #1
 Michael Colton as Doghouse Boy #2
 Daniel Lee as Doghouse Boy #3

Reception
The film received positive reviews, currently holding a 75% rating on Rotten Tomatoes from 40 critics; the consensus simply states: "Spirited and sweet with an emphasis on the healing power of friendship, The Mighty is a modest charmer that comes by its whimsy honestly."

References

External links
 
 
 
 

1998 films
1990s English-language films
1990s coming-of-age comedy-drama films
1990s buddy comedy-drama films
American buddy comedy-drama films
American independent films
American coming-of-age comedy-drama films
Films based on American novels
Films set in Ohio
Films set in schools
Films about death
Films shot in Ohio
Films set in Cincinnati
Films directed by Peter Chelsom
Films produced by Don Carmody
Films scored by Trevor Jones
Miramax films
1998 comedy films
1998 drama films
1998 independent films
1990s American films
Films about disability